Andrea Hope Elson (born March 6, 1969) is an American former actress. Beginning her professional career as a child actress and model, Elson is perhaps best known for her television roles as Alice Tyler on the CBS science-fiction adventure series Whiz Kids and as Lynn Tanner on the NBC comedy series ALF, which garnered the teenage actress two Youth in Film Award nominations in 1986 and 1989.

Early life
Elson was born in New York City on March 6, 1969.  She grew up in New York City with her parents and an older sister named Samantha (born circa 1966).  While Elson was still a child, the family moved to San Diego, California for a period of four years before returning to Westchester County, New York.

Career
Elson began her professional career as a child actress and model, appearing in a number of commercials and print advertisements. She also appeared in several community theatre productions as a child while living in San Diego.

In 1983, after relocating with her family to Los Angeles, Elson made her television debut at the age of 14 with a co-starring role on the CBS mystery-adventure series, Whiz Kids.  On the series, Elson portrayed Alice Tyler, co-starring with Matthew Laborteaux, Todd Porter, and Jeffrey Jacquet as a group of teenage detectives who solve crimes and bring perpetrators to justice with the help of a talking computer.

Although Whiz Kids lasted only one season, Elson's role as Alice established the 14-year-old and her teenage co-stars as prominent fixtures in the various teen magazines of the era, including 16 magazine, Bop and Teen Beat, among others.  The role also led to Elson and the rest of the teenage Whiz Kids cast to make a crossover appearance on the 1983 episode of Simon & Simon titled "Fly the Alibi Skies".

In 1986, Elson landed a co-starring role on the NBC science-fiction situation comedy ALF. On the series, Elson portrayed Lynn Tanner, the teenage daughter in a typical middle-class suburban family who adopt a friendly extraterrestrial, performed by puppeteer Paul Fusco.  The series lasted four seasons and Elson's portrayal earned the teenage actress two Youth in Film Award nominations before the series' cancellation in 1990.

After the cancellation of ALF, Elson continued to appear in a variety of television roles, guest starring on numerous popular television series of the time, including Who's the Boss?, Parker Lewis Can't Lose, ABC Afterschool Special, Married... with Children, Mad About You, Step by Step, and The Young and the Restless, as well as appearing in the television films Class Cruise and Frankenstein: The College Years.

Personal life
As of 2016, Elson was working as the owner/director of a yoga studio.

Filmography
Whiz Kids (1983–84)
Simon & Simon (1984)
Silver Spoons (1985)
ALF (1986–1990)
Class Cruise (1989)
Parker Lewis Can't Lose (1990)
Who's the Boss? (1990)
They Came from Outer Space (1990)
ABC Afterschool Special (1991)
Frankenstein: The College Years (1991)
Married People (1991)
Married... with Children (1993)
Mad About You (1994)
Surgical Strike (1994) (Video Game)
Step by Step (1996)
Kirk (1996)
Men Behaving Badly (1997)
The Young and the Restless (1998)

Awards

References

External links

1969 births
Living people
20th-century American actresses
Actresses from New York (state)
American child actresses
American child models
American television actresses
People from Westchester County, New York
21st-century American women